The Men's 2002 European Amateur Boxing Championships were held in Perm, Russia from July 12 to July 21. The 34th edition of thi bi-annual competition was organised by the European governing body for amateur boxing, EABA.

Medal winners

External links
Results
EABA Boxing

E
B
European Amateur Boxing Championships
B
Boxing Championships
July 2002 sports events in Europe